The bubble octant and bubble sextant are air navigation instruments. Although an instrument is called a "bubble sextant", it may actually be a bubble octant.

Use
Ships had long used sextants for navigation, but sextants had problems in aircraft navigation.

A ship at sea is on a relatively flat surface and can use the horizon to measure the altitude of celestial objects.

An aircraft may not have the sea's horizon as a flat reference surface. It may be flying over land where the horizon is formed by mountains of unknown height.

A solution to the problem was to use a bubble to determine the reference plane.

The bubble in an airplane is subject to the plane's acceleration. If the plane is in sharp turn, the bubble will be displaced. Consequently, when the navigator is using a bubble sextant, the pilot tries to fly the plane straight and level.

Even when flying straight and level, the plane is subject to accelerations from density and wind changes. Consequently, many readings are taken and then averaged for a more accurate result. Some bubble octants have accessories to make the averaging simpler.

Development

Isaac Newton developed the quadrant.

The octant was a further improvement. It could measure altitudes of up to 90° above the horizon.

The sextant became the standard navigation instrument for ships. It could measure altitudes of up to about 120 degrees. That allowed the navigator to sight the horizon in front and measure the altitude of a star that was slightly behind.

The first bubble instruments were bubble sextants copying the features of an ordinary sextant. However, a bubble instrument does not view the horizon, so it never needs to measure an angle >90°. Modern instruments are technically bubble octants, though they may be labelled bubble sextants.

Gago Coutinho developed the first bubble sextant.

See also
Amelia Earhart. Her navigator, Fred Noonan, used a bubble octant.
Eddie Rickenbacker. A damaged bubble octant caused a navigation error resulting in a ditching at sea.

References

External links
 Aircraft Sextant. Smithsonian Institution. 
 
 
 "Bubble sextant", Smithsonian Institution. Bausch and Lomb type 23
 
 
 
 

Air navigation
Celestial navigation
Navigational equipment